Short Bend Township is an inactive township in Dent County, in the U.S. state of Missouri.

Short Bend Township was established in 1873, taking its name from the community of Short Bend, Missouri.

References

Townships in Missouri
Townships in Dent County, Missouri